The Former Gardiners offices is on Old Bread Street, Bristol, England.

It was built in 1865-7 by Foster and Wood and is an example of the Bristol Byzantine style.

It has been designated by English Heritage as a grade II listed building.

References

See also
 Grade II listed buildings in Bristol

Grade II listed buildings in Bristol
Office buildings completed in 1867
Byzantine Revival architecture in the United Kingdom
1867 establishments in England